Bandar Universiti Pagoh (Jawi: باندر اونيۏرسيتي ڤاڬوه) is a new township built around Pagoh Education Hub and is partly developed by Sime Darby Property in Pagoh, Muar District, Johor, Malaysia, Malaysia. It is strategically located next to Pagoh Interchange on the North-South Expressway (NSE) and only 20 minutes drive away to the Royal Town of Muar, Johor. Bandar Universiti Pagoh will make its mark as an international education destination and national
acclaim.

Pagoh educational hub

Pagoh higher education hub located in Pagoh University Town, which is the first and largest public higher education hub in Malaysia.

The development of the university town of Pagoh following the example of the Qatar Education City and the Science and Technology Park (Qatar Education City) was the spark of inspiration for Y.A.B. Tan Sri Dato’ Dr. Muhyiddin Muhammad Yassin  during his tenure as the 10th Deputy Prime Minister of Malaysia, expecting operations to begin in mid-2016.

The development of HPTP began on 24 June 2011, after Cabinet Council approved the project to be implemented through PFI-BLMT (Private Fund Initiative) by Sime Darby Property Selatan Sdn. Bhd. (SDPS).. The Inauguration and Groundbreaking Ceremony Tanah  was officiated by Y.A.B. Tan Sri Dato’ Dr. Muhyiddin Muhammad Yassin, Deputy Prime Minister of Malaysia and Minister of Education of Malaysia at Ladang Lanadron, Panchor, Muar, Johor on 15 September 2011.

The University Development Master Plan for the construction of this HPTP has been specially designed to support the objectives of the Public University/Polytechnic involved by taking into account the development and projections for the next 10 to 20 years. .

HPTP is located less than 2 km from the Pagoh TOL Plaza exit and covers an area of over 200 hectares. There are four educational institutions, namely three public universities and a polytechnic.

The diversity of core studies offered by the Public University/ Polytechnic at HPTP with the latest estimated number of students of 7,500 people has boosted the socioeconomics in the surrounding area.

List of universities and polytechnic

 Universiti Teknologi Malaysia (ICA Research Centre)
 International Islamic University Malaysia (South Campus)
 Universiti Tun Hussein Onn (Pagoh Campus)
 Politeknik Tun Syed Nasir Syed Ismail

Shared Facilities Components
Shared Facilities in Hab Pendidikan Tinggi Pagoh (Pagoh Higher Education Hub) is under the supervision and management of the Seksyen Projek Khas Hab Pendidikan Tinggi Pagoh, Bahagian Pembangunan, Ministry of Higher Education. It is provided specifically for the use of Public University/ Polytechnic residents and the local community in general.

This facility is divided into three main zones namely Zone 1 (Convention Hall, Auditorium Hall and Multipurpose Hall), Zone 2 (Shared Facilities Library, Data Center, Surau, Cafeteria, and Guest House) and Zone 3 (Sports Stadium, Track & Field, Futsal Complex and Aquatic Center).

Outdoor Sports Facilities : Track & Field, Football, Hockey, Rugby, Lawn Bowl, Tennis, Netball, Basketball, Volleyball and Sepak Takraw.
Indoor Sports Facilities : Futsal, Basketball, Badminton and Ping Pong.
Convention Center : 1,807 m2 with a capacity of 1,000 people. Dressing Room for any curricular and co -curricular activities.
Multipurpose Halls : 3 Main Halls - 2 for use as Examination Halls with a capacity of 1,000 students, a Basketball court and 4 Badminton courts.
Auditorium Hall : 2 lecture halls with a capacity of 500 people, 4 lecture halls with a capacity of 250 people and 6 business spaces.
Shared Facilities Library Building : 4,000 m2. Houses a Shared Facilities Library, internet access facilities, multi-functional spaces, Data Center and Cafeteria.
Surau Gunasama : With a capacity of 200 worshipers.
Kindergarten : 629 m2 with a capacity of 50 people.
Guest House : 2,945 m2. Features 60 room units of various types.
Sports Stadium : Capacity 1,000 people. Tracks and field that meet IAAF Standard.
Futsal Complex : 4 indoor futsal courts.
Aquatic Center : Olympic-class Swimming Pools and Diving Pool.

See also
 Pagoh
 Muar (town)

References

External links
 Bandar Universiti Pagoh on Sime Darby Property
 Pagoh Higher Education Hub on Ministry of Higher Education
 

Townships in Johor
Towns, suburbs and villages in Muar
Muar District